Xiabu Xiabu Catering Management Co., Ltd. or Xiabu Xiabu is a fast food hot pot restaurant chain in China. Its headquarters is in Daxing District, Beijing.

History

Founding in 1998
The company was established in 1998.

Business expansion
As of 2008, the company used centralized kitchens, and one hot pot meal at Xiabu Xiabu had a cost of 27 renminbi or $4 U.S. dollars.

In November 2008, Xiabu Xiabu had 53 locations in Beijing. The company planned to have 60 locations by the end of that year.

In 2008, Actis Capital paid $51 million U.S. dollars to acquire a majority stake of Xiabu Xiabu. Actis stated that in a three-year period it wished to increase the number of stores by three times the original number.

2012
In 2012, Actis sold the company to global growth equity firm General Atlantic. Actis intended to be paid $150 million for its sale. In September 2018, the chain lost £145 million in market value after a customer found a dead rat in her soup at an outlet in Weifang.

As of 2012, there were over 300 Xiabu Xiabu restaurants in the cities of Beijing, Shanghai, and Tianjin and in the provinces of Hebei, Jiangsu, and Liaoning.

By 2021, there were 1,077 Xiabu Xiabu (and sister brand Coucou) restaurants.

References

External links

  Xiabu Xiabu
 Xiabu Xiabu - General Atlantic

Restaurants in Beijing
1998 establishments in China
Restaurants established in 1998
Fast-food chains of China